The Widows of Thursdays is a 2009 Argentine-Spanish crime drama film directed by Marcelo Piñeyro and based on the novel of the same name by Claudia Piñeiro (published in English as Thursday Night Widows). It stars an ensemble cast consisting of Pablo Echarri, Leonardo Sbaraglia, Juan Diego Botto, Ernesto Alterio, Ana Celentano, Juana Viale, Gabriela Toscano and Gloria Carrá. The story focuses on a crime committed in a gated community and the secrets surrounding wealthy families who reside there.

Cast 
 Pablo Echarri as Tano
 Leonardo Sbaraglia as Ronnie
 Ernesto Alterio as Martín
 Juan Diego Botto as Gustavo
  as Teresa
  as Carla
 Gabriela Toscano as Mavy 
 Gloria Carrá as Lala
  as Trina
  as Juan
 Adrián Navarro as Security guard
 Roberto Antier - Apoderado

References

External links 

2009 crime drama films
2009 LGBT-related films
2009 films
Argentine crime drama films
Argentine LGBT-related films
Argentine mystery films
Films about domestic violence
Films about rape
Films about suicide
Films based on Argentine novels
Films set in Argentina
Films based on crime novels
LGBT-related drama films
2000s Spanish films
Spanish crime drama films
2000s Argentine films
2000s Spanish-language films